The Kuldiha Wildlife Sanctuary is situated in the Balasore district of Odisha, India. The sanctuary is spread across  in the Chota Nagpur Plateau region. It is linked with Simlipal National Park via the Sukhupada and Nato hill ranges. It is classified as an Eastern Highlands moist deciduous forests ecoregion.

Description

Kuldiha was declared a sanctuary on 4 January 1984. It is famous for the Mayurbhanj Elephant Reserve that spreads across Simlipal, Kuldiha and Hadgarh wildlife reserves. Locally in Kuldiha, the elephant reserve is known as Tenda Elephant Reserve. There is a watch tower strategically created at Garsimulia for animal lovers to have a look at elephants bathing or drinking water from a small stream that runs right through the reserve. The sanctuary offers night stay accommodation at Kuldiha entrance, Jadachua and Rishia in form of huts, tents and a few concrete houses. Prior reservation is required for night stay. It is usually closed during the peak monsoon season which typically falls between July and September. Major fire was reported in 2012 that engulfed both Simlipal and Kuldiha forests causing significant damage to flora and fauna.

Flora and fauna

It is a mixed deciduous forest dominated by the Sal tree.  Various animals inhabit the forest, including Tiger, Leopard, Elephant, Gaur, Sambar, Giant Squirrel, Hill Myna, Peafowl, Hornbills, other migratory birds and reptiles. The sanctuary is a haven for environmental and animal research. There are numerous scientific surveys and reports available that focus on the study of flora and fauna of the sanctuary.

Tourism
Kuldiha is an integral part of tourism in northern Odisha, attracting tourists and scholars alike.

Ecotourism
Odisha's government took recognition of the environmental damage being done by private operators to many parks, sanctuaries and reserves resulting in a sustainable threat to biodiversity. It came up with an ecotourism focus to conserve the pristine state of nature while making it economically viable with a PPP model. Kuldiha sanctuary is operated in a community based ecotourism model that benefits locals and tribesmen inhabiting the core area of the sanctuary.

Access
The sanctuary is almost equidistant from Bhubaneswar and Kolkata.  It is easier to reach from Bhubaneswar, being the capital city of Odisha state. The nearest airport is Biju Patnaik International Airport. The nearest railway station is Balasore railway station. One can take NH16 (earlier designated NH5) and reach Nilagiri via Odisha state highway 19; thereafter a scenic narrow road leads to the sanctuary entrance.

See also
Indian Council of Forestry Research and Education
Panchalingeshwar
Wildlife sanctuaries of India

References

Notes
Approval from Himalaya Publishing House to use their academic report uploaded herewith for future reference.

External links 
Kuldiha Tourism

Wildlife sanctuaries in Odisha
Chota Nagpur dry deciduous forests
1984 establishments in Orissa
Protected areas established in 1984